Ogato Sana, also known as Kawo Sana Ogato in the Wolaitta language, was the one of the most renowned kings of the Tigre dynasty along with the Kingdom of Wolaita. King Ogato had acquired all of the regions, not only by battle, but also through deception and the employment of spys among the Gamo, Gofa, Kucha, and Kambata tribes. During his reign, the pre-colonial Wolaita kingdom's agricultural modernization effort included expanding acreage, installing irrigation canals, and improving cattle breeds in order to implement modern dairy farming. King Ogato Sana was 10th rulers of the Wolaita kingdom under the Tigre dynasty. King Ogato had erected his palace at top of the Damot hills, driven the Hadiya people out of the present-day Humbo and Abaya in the north, and captured other provinces. To protect himself from intruders, he erected a fortification around his castle on Damot hill, as well as a defense trench surrounding Sore Mashedo.

References 

Leaders of the Kingdom of Wolayita
People from Wolayita Zone
12th-century Ethiopian people
13th-century Ethiopian people